Sporting Clube de Portugal is a professional billiards team based in Lisbon, Portugal, founded in 1930. The team competes in the Portuguese Billiards League and in European championships, in both carom billiards (three-cushion) and pool (eight-ball and nine-ball) events.  The team includes some players from Belgium, France and Spain.

Honours

Three-cushion

Men
Portuguese Three-cushion Men's Billiards League
 Winners (17): 1964–65, 1967–68, 1969–70, 1972–73, 1973–74, 1977–78, 1979–80, 1981–82, 1989–90, 1990–91, 1995–96, 1996–97, 1997–98, 1998–99, 2003–04, 2007–08, 2014–15

Portuguese Three-cushion Men's Billiards Cup
 Winners (4): 1964–65, 1995–96, 1996–97, 1997–98

Portuguese Three-cushion Men's Billiards Super Cup
 Winners (5): 1995–96, 1996–97, 1998–99, 2003–04, 2004–05

European Three-cushion Billiards Cup 
 (3): 1995–96, 2001–02, 2004–05

Pool

Men
Portuguese Pool Men's Billiards League
 Winners (3): 1997–98, 1998–99, 2015–16

Portuguese Pool Men's Billiards Cup
 Winners (4): 1997–98, 1998–99, 2000–01, 2015–16

Portuguese Pool Men's Billiards Super Cup
 Winners (4): 1998–99, 1999–00, 2001–02, 2016–17

Women
Portuguese Pool Women's Billiards League
 Winners (4): 1998–99, 1999–00, 2000–01, 2001–02

Portuguese Pool Women's Billiards Cup
 Winners (1): 2000–01

Portuguese Pool Women's Billiards Super Cup
 Winners (2): 1999–00, 2001–02

Portuguese Pool

Men
National Portuguese Pool Men's Billiards League
 Winners (2): 2015–16, 2016–17

National Portuguese Pool Men's Billiards Cup
 Winners (1): 2014–15

National Portuguese Pool Men's Billiards Super Cup
 Winners (2): 2015–16, 2016–17

Current squad

Notable past athletes

João Pereira
Jorge Theriaga
Rute Saraiva
Alfredo Alhinho

Technical staff

References

External links
Sporting billiards official website

Sporting CP sports
Sport in Lisbon
Cue sports teams
1930 establishments in Portugal
Cue sports in Portugal